Maurice Wilkes (1913–2010) was a computer scientist at the University of Cambridge.

Maurice Wilkes may also refer to:
 Maurice Wilks (1904–1963), automotive and aeronautical engineer
 Maurice Canning Wilks (1910–1984), Irish landscape painter

See also
 Maurice Wilk (died 1963), American violinist
 Maurice Wilkins (1916–2004), Nobel laureate and physicist